Økland is a surname. Notable people with the surname include:

Arne Larsen Økland (born 1954), former Norwegian football player and coach
Einar Økland (born 1940), Norwegian lyricist, playwright, essayist and children's writer
Kari Økland (born 1955), Norwegian politician for the Christian Democratic Party
Nils Økland (1882–1969), Norwegian Esperantist and teacher in Stord (Hordaland), Norway
Nils Økland (musician) (born 1961), Norwegian Hardangar fiddle player
Torbjørn Økland (born 1964), Norwegian musician

See also
Aukland (disambiguation)